The Somaliland Custodial Corps is the section of the Somaliland Armed Forces  that is  responsible for the maintenance and guarding of prisons.

History
Somaliland Custodial Corps established 1 November 1949 was known as Somaliland Prisons Service.The missions of Somaliland Custodial Corps is guarding of prisons.

Ranks 

Officers

Enlisted

Gallery

See also
Somaliland Armed Forces
Somaliland Police Force
Somaliland Army
Somaliland Navy

References

Military of Somaliland
1993 establishments in Somaliland
Law enforcement in Somaliland